Horus is a god of the ancient Egyptian religion.

Horus may also refer to:

 Horus name, an ancient Egyptian title
Horus (Greek mythology)

Other gods
 Heru-ur or Horus the Elder, son of Geb and Nut and uncle of Horus
 Harpocrates or Horus the Younger, son of Horus and Hathor

People
 Horus (athlete) (fl. 4th century), an Olympic boxer and Cynic philosopher from Late Roman Egypt
 Horus (wrestler), the ring name of a Mexican professional wrestler
 Horus Engels (1914–1991), German artist
 Rey Horus, Mexican wrestler

Science and technology
 Horus (arachnid), a pseudoscorpion genus in the family Olpiidae
 1924 Horus, an asteroid
 21900 Orus, an asteroid
 AMD Horus, a computer bus
 FT-100 Horus, an unmanned aerial vehicle
 HORUS, Herschel Orbital Reconnaissance of the Uranian System (proposed)

Other uses
 Horus (community), a religious movement
 Horus Music, British music company

See also

 Eye of Horus, an ancient Egyptian symbol of protection
 Horace (disambiguation)